The 1908 Cleveland Naps season was a season in American baseball. The team finished second in the American League with a record of 90–64, just one-half game behind the Detroit Tigers. The Naps finished with the same number of wins as the Tigers, but with one additional loss. By the standard of the era, that gave the Tigers the pennant.

Regular season

Season standings

Record vs. opponents

Roster

Player stats

Batting

Starters by position 
Note: Pos = Position; G = Games played; AB = At bats; H = Hits; Avg. = Batting average; HR = Home runs; RBI = Runs batted in

Other batters 
Note: G = Games played; AB = At bats; H = Hits; Avg. = Batting average; HR = Home runs; RBI = Runs batted in

Pitching

Starting pitchers 
Note: G = Games pitched; IP = Innings pitched; W = Wins; L = Losses; ERA = Earned run average; SO = Strikeouts

Other pitchers 
Note: G = Games pitched; IP = Innings pitched; W = Wins; L = Losses; ERA = Earned run average; SO = Strikeouts

Relief pitchers 
Note: G = Games pitched; W = Wins; L = Losses; SV = Saves; ERA = Earned run average; SO = Strikeouts

References 
1908 Cleveland Naps season at Baseball Reference

Cleveland Guardians seasons
Cleveland Naps season
Cleveland Naps